BT in Italy is represented by BT Italia S.p.A., which is the second largest business telecommunication operator in the Italian market, controlling an 11% share.

History
BT Italia is the result of a series of industrial ventures and mergers that started with the founding of Albacom in 1995, then a joint venture of BT, BNL, ENI and Mediaset, each company controlling a 25% share. BT acted as the industrial partner, whereas the three other companies outsourced most or all of their telecommunication needs to Albacom, BNL significantly contributing its packet-switched network that served as the basis of Albacom's trunk.

The captive business kick-started Albacom's presence in the Italian TLC market, and enabled the company to aggressively start selling its services in the market at large.

In a separate deal, BT acquired in 2001 a controlling stake in the then-booming I.NET, founded in 1994 as an ISP and fast growing in the datacenter and IT services business with a strong emphasis on IT security. I.NET had been floated in 2000 on Milan Stock Exchange, and kept operating independently, and BT's influence on its policy was through the board of directors where however it did not hold any executive post.

In 2002-2005 Albacom suffered from slowing growth and its financials turned into red; in the same time frame the non-TLC partners negotiated with BT an exit from the venture which was finalized in 2005 with BT acquiring 100% of the capital and Albacom (that closely afterwards was renamed as BT Albacom) keeping long-term contracts with all three former shareholders.

In 2006, BT won a multi-year worldwide outsourcing contract with FIAT, that included the purchase of Atlanet, FIAT's TLC venture. Atlanet was then merged with Albacom to become BT Italia.

In 2007, BT made a public offer to purchase 100% of I.NET's capital, acknowledging a plan to merge the company into BT Italia and delisting the resulting company. Although some investors, that did not agree on delisting and had some doubts on the industrial plan, brought on litigation, the merger was completed on 11 January, 2008  and I.NET was delisted the same day. At the same time BT Italia acquires ERPTech S.p.A..

On 18 October 2019, BT launches the new logo and the new slogan "Beyond Limits".

References

External links

Telecommunications companies of Italy
Internet service providers of Italy
Telecommunications companies established in 2006
BT Group